The 2019 NCAA Division I women's basketball tournament was a single-elimination tournament of 64 teams to determine the national champion for the 2018–19 NCAA Division I women's basketball season. The 38th annual edition of the tournament began on March 22, and concluded with the championship game on April 7 at Amalie Arena in Tampa, Florida, with the University of South Florida serving as host. The tournament field was announced on March 18.

Three schools, Colonial champion Towson, MEAC champion Bethune–Cookman and Southland champion Abilene Christian, made their first appearance in the tournament. Meanwhile, Tennessee continued its record streak of making every NCAA women's basketball tournament at 38 consecutive appearances. UConn also continued its record streak of 12 consecutive Final Four appearances.

Tournament procedure

	
Pending any changes to the format, a total of 64 teams will enter the 2019 tournament. 32 automatic bids shall be awarded to each program that wins their conference's tournament. The remaining 36 bids are "at-large", with selections extended by the NCAA Selection Committee. The tournament is split into four regional tournaments, and each regional has teams seeded from 1 to 16, with the committee ostensibly making every region as comparable to the others as possible. The top-seeded team in each region plays the #16 team, the #2 team plays the #15, etc. (meaning where the two seeds add up to 17, that team will be assigned to play another).

The selection committee will also seed the entire field from 1 to 64.

2019 NCAA tournament schedule and venues 
The first two rounds, also referred to as the subregionals, were played at the sites of the top 16 seeds, as was done since 2015.  However, the subregional that would otherwise have been hosted by South Carolina was moved to Charlotte, North Carolina due to the Gamecocks' home, Colonial Life Arena, being used for the men's tournament.

Subregionals (first and second rounds)
 March 22–24
 KFC Yum! Center, Louisville, Kentucky (Host: University of Louisville)
 Dale F. Halton Arena, Charlotte, North Carolina (Host: University of North Carolina at Charlotte)
 Carver-Hawkeye Arena, Iowa City, Iowa (Host: University of Iowa)
 Reed Arena, College Station, Texas (Host: Texas A&M University)
 Harry A. Gampel Pavilion, Storrs, Connecticut (Host: University of Connecticut)
 Watsco Center, Coral Gables, Florida (Host: University of Miami)
 Humphrey Coliseum, Starkville, Mississippi (Host: Mississippi State University)
 Matthew Knight Arena, Eugene, Oregon (Host: University of Oregon)
 March 23–25
 Edmund P. Joyce Center, Notre Dame, Indiana (Host: University of Notre Dame)
 Xfinity Center, College Park, Maryland (Host: University of Maryland)
 Reynolds Coliseum, Raleigh, North Carolina (Host: North Carolina State University)
 Carrier Dome, Syracuse, New York (Host: Syracuse University)
 Maples Pavilion, Stanford, California (Host: Stanford University)
 Hilton Coliseum, Ames, Iowa (Host: Iowa State University)
 Gill Coliseum, Corvallis, Oregon (Host: Oregon State University)
 Ferrell Center, Waco, Texas (Host: Baylor University)

Regional semifinals and finals (Sweet Sixteen and Elite Eight)
 March 29-April 1
 Albany regional, Times Union Center, Albany, New York (Hosts: MAAC)
 Chicago regional, Wintrust Arena, Chicago, Illinois (Host: DePaul)
 Greensboro regional, Greensboro Coliseum, Greensboro, North Carolina (Host: Atlantic Coast Conference)
 Portland regional, Moda Center, Portland, Oregon (Host: Oregon State)
National semifinals and championship (Final Four and championship)
 April 5 and April 7
 Amalie Arena, Tampa, Florida (Host: University of South Florida)

This is the third time that the women's Final Four was played in Tampa (previously, in 2008 and 2015).

Subregionals tournament and automatic qualifiers

Automatic qualifiers
The following teams automatically qualified for the 2019 NCAA field by virtue of winning their conference's tournament.

Tournament seeds

Bracket
All times are listed as Eastern Daylight Time (UTC−4)
* – Denotes overtime period

Albany regional – Albany, New York

* – Denotes overtime period

Albany regional final

Albany Regional all tournament team
 Napheesa Collier, UConn (MOP)
 Katie Lou Samuelson, UConn
 Crystal Dangerfield, UConn
 Asia Durr, Louisville
 Sam Fuehring, Louisville

Chicago regional – Chicago, Illinois

* – Denotes overtime period

Chicago regional final

Chicago Regional all tournament team
 Arike Ogunbowale, Notre Dame (MOP)
 Jessica Shepard, Notre Dame
 Alanna Smith, Stanford
 Kiana Williams, Stanford
 Chennedy Carter, Texas A&M

Greensboro regional – Greensboro, North Carolina

* – Denotes overtime period

Greensboro regional final

Greensboro Regional all tournament team
 Lauren Cox, Baylor (MOP)
 DiDi Richards, Baylor
 Chloe Jackson, Baylor
 Kalani Brown, Baylor
 Megan Gustafson, Iowa

Portland regional – Portland, Oregon

Portland regional final

Portland Regional all tournament team
 Sabrina Ionescu, Oregon (MOP)
 Satou Sabally, Oregon
 Ruthy Hebard, Oregon
 Teaira McCowan, Mississippi State
 Anriel Howard, Mississippi State

Final Four
During the Final Four round, regardless of the seeds of the participating teams, the champion of the top overall top seed's region (Baylor's Greensboro Region) plays against the champion of the fourth-ranked top seed's region (Mississippi State's Portland Region), and the champion of the second overall top seed's region (Notre Dame's Chicago Region) plays against the champion of the third-ranked top seed's region (Louisville's Albany Region).

Amalie Arena – Tampa, Florida

National semifinals

National championship

Final Four all-tournament team
 Chloe Jackson (MOP), Baylor
 Kalani Brown, Baylor
 Lauren Cox, Baylor
 Marina Mabrey, Notre Dame
 Arike Ogunbowale, Notre Dame

Record by conference

 The R64, R32, S16, E8, F4, CG, and NC columns indicate how many teams from each conference were in the round of 64 (first round), round of 32 (second round), Sweet 16, Elite Eight, Final Four, championship game, and national champion, respectively.
 The America East, Atlantic 10, Atlantic Sun, Big Sky, Big South, Big West, Conference USA, Colonial, Horizon, Ivy League, MAAC, MEAC, Mountain West, Northeast, Ohio Valley, Patriot, Southern, Southland, Sun Belt, SWAC and WAC conferences each had one representative that was eliminated in the first round.

Media coverage

Television
The tournament was covered by ESPN's networks. During the first and second rounds, ESPN aired select games nationally on ESPN2, ESPNU, and ESPNews. All other games aired regionally on ESPN, ESPN2, or ESPN3 and were streamed online via WatchESPN. Most of the nation got whip-a-round coverage during this time, which allowed ESPN to rotate between the games and focus the nation on the game that had the closest score. Over the course of rebroadcasting a studio program discussing the men's tournament, ESPNU accidentally displayed on-screen graphics prematurely revealing the tournament bracket prior to its formal unveiling that evening. The NCAA officially released the brackets two hours earlier than scheduled. Some watch parties for schools scheduled with the bracket reveal were cancelled, and ESPN apologized for the error.

Studio host and analysts
 Maria Taylor (Host)
 Andy Landers (Analyst)
 Rebecca Lobo (Analyst) (First, Second rounds, Final Four and National championship game)
 Nell Fortner (Analyst) (Regionals, Final Four and National championship game)

Broadcast assignments

First & second rounds Friday/Sunday
 Beth Mowins & Nell Fortner – Louisville, Kentucky
 Eric Frede & Christy Thomaskutty – Charlotte, North Carolina
 John Brickley & Christy Winters-Scott – Iowa City, Iowa
 Lowell Galindo & A'ja Wilson – College Station, Texas
 Adam Amin & Kara Lawson – Storrs, Connecticut
 Clay Matvick & Julianne Viani – Coral Gables, Florida
 Paul Sunderland & Steffi Sorensen – Starkville, Mississippi
 Dave Pasch & LaChina Robinson – Eugene, Oregon
Sweet Sixteen & Elite Eight Friday/Sunday
 Adam Amin, Kara Lawson, Rebecca Lobo & Holly Rowe – Albany, New York
 Dave Pasch, LaChina Robinson & Brooke Weisbrod – Portland, Oregon
Final Four
 Adam Amin, Kara Lawson, Rebecca Lobo & Holly Rowe – Tampa, Florida

First & second rounds Saturday/Monday
 Courtney Lyle & Tamika Catchings – Notre Dame, Indiana
 Roy Philpott & Brooke Weisbrod – College Park, Maryland
 Melissa Lee & Mike Thibault – Raleigh, North Carolina
 Sam Gore & Blair Schaefer – Syracuse, New York
 Elise Woodward & Dan Hughes – Stanford, California
 Brenda VanLengen & Andraya Carter – Ames, Iowa
 Tiffany Greene & Mary Murphy – Corvallis, Oregon
 Pam Ward & Carolyn Peck – Waco, Texas
Sweet Sixteen & Elite Eight Saturday/Monday
 Pam Ward, Carolyn Peck & Allison Williams – Greensboro, North Carolina
 Beth Mowins, Debbie Antonelli & Courtney Lyle – Chicago, Illinois
Championship
 Adam Amin, Kara Lawson, Rebecca Lobo & Holly Rowe – Tampa, Florida

Radio
Westwood One had exclusive radio rights to the entire tournament. Teams participating in the Regional finals, Final Four, and Championship were allowed to have their own local broadcasts, but they weren’t allowed to stream those broadcasts online.

Regional finals Sunday
 John Sadak & Julianne Viani – Albany, New York
 John Ramey & Kristen Kozlowski – Portland, Oregon
Final Four
 John Sadak, Debbie Antonelli, & Krista Blunk – Tampa, Florida

Regional finals Monday
 Justin Kutcher & Kim Adams – Greensboro, North Carolina
 Ted Emrich & Krista Blunk – Chicago, Illinois
Championship
 John Sadak, Debbie Antonelli, & Krista Blunk – Tampa, Florida

See also 
 2019 NCAA Division I men's basketball tournament
 2019 NCAA Division II men's basketball tournament
 2019 NCAA Division III men's basketball tournament
 2019 NCAA Division II women's basketball tournament
 2019 Women's National Invitation Tournament
 2019 U Sports Women's Basketball Championship
 2019 National Invitation Tournament
 2019 NAIA Division I women's basketball tournament
 2019 NAIA Division II women's basketball tournament
 2019 NAIA Division I men's basketball tournament
 2019 NAIA Division II men's basketball tournament
 2019 Women's Basketball Invitational
 2019 College Basketball Invitational
 2019 CollegeInsider.com Postseason Tournament

References

External links 
 NCAA Women's Basketball Division I

    
NCAA Division I women's basketball tournament
NCAA Division I women's basketball tournament
NCAA Division I women's basketball tournament
NCAA Division I women's basketball tournament